Georgetown Waterfront Park is a national park completed in Washington, D.C. in the fall of 2011.  Part of the Georgetown Historic District, the park stretches along the banks of the Potomac River from 31st Street, NW to the Key Bridge. The result of many years of advocacy and fundraising, the site features several notable design elements. Now complete, the park links  of parkland along the Potomac River stretching from Cumberland, Maryland to Mount Vernon, Virginia. The park was designed to passively complement the natural curve of the river.

History 
The park has been in various stages of planning and development for several decades.  In 1968, the National Capital Planning Commission identified the Georgetown Waterfront as future parkland.  An agreement was reached between the National Park Service and the mayor of the District of Columbia to transfer  of land for the proposed park.

In recent years, the Georgetown waterfront has been redeveloped from industrial blight to a thriving commercial and residential destination.  Parts of the park site had served as a parking lot before construction began. The Washington Harbour complex and a movie theater on the Georgetown Incinerator site regularly draw crowds down to the waterfront.

Design elements 
The park features gently sloping grass hills and shade trees. The landscape blends with mixed-use paved pathways. The promenade provides panoramic views of Theodore Roosevelt Island, the Key Bridge, and the Kennedy Center.  Several distinctive design elements include an interactive fountain, river stairs, and scenic overlooks.  This part of the park, known as the Wisconsin Avenue Plaza, serves as a gateway to the Potomac River.

References 
 A Short History of the Park
 Georgetown Historic District
 Historical Planning Document - Georgetown Waterfront Park
 Kaplan, Peter "City seeks plans for Georgetown incinerator", Washington Business Journal, Friday, June 28, 1996

External links 

 Georgetown Waterfront Park - A National Park on the Potomac
 Lucas, Phillip "Phase 2 construction restarts at Georgetown Waterfront Park," The Washington Post, August 6, 2010
 Dvorak, Petula "Hope for the Waterfront at Last?", The Washington Post, May 11, 2006 
 The Capital Crescent Trail
 Current Construction Wisconsin to 31st Street 

Georgetown (Washington, D.C.)
National Park Service areas in Washington, D.C.
Parks in Washington, D.C.
Rock Creek Park
Protected areas established in 2011
2011 establishments in Washington, D.C.